The hepatic artery proper (also proper hepatic artery) is the artery that supplies the liver and gallbladder. It raises from the common hepatic artery, a branch of the celiac artery.

Structure 
The hepatic artery proper arises from the common hepatic artery and runs alongside the portal vein and the common bile duct to form the portal triad. A branch of the common hepatic artery –the gastroduodenal artery gives off the small supraduodenal artery to the duodenal bulb.  Then the right gastric artery comes off and runs to the left along the lesser curvature of the stomach to meet the left gastric artery, which is a branch of the celiac trunk.  It subsequently bifurcates into the right and left hepatic arteries.

Variant anatomy
Of note, the right and left hepatic arteries may demonstrate variant anatomy.  A misplaced right hepatic artery may arise from the superior mesenteric artery (SMA) and a misplaced left hepatic artery may arise from the left gastric artery. The cystic artery generally comes from the right hepatic artery.

Other variants of right hepatic artery includes: arising directly from the proximal or middle part of common hepatic artery, gastroduodenal artery, superior mesenteric artery, celiac axis, aorta, splenic artery, or left gastric artery instead of arising from proper hepatic artery.

Additional images

References

External links
Proper hepatic artery  - Washington Hospital Center.
  - "Stomach, Spleen and Liver: Contents of the Hepatoduodenal ligament"
 
 
 Cystic artery

Arteries of the abdomen